Goalball at the 2000 Summer Paralympics consisted of men's and women's team events.

Medal table

Medallists

References 

 

2000 Summer Paralympics events
2000
Goalball in Australia